Amit Nimade is an Indian photographer known for his works in fine art photography.

Career
Amit Nimade, was born in Indore, Madhya Pradesh, India, and grew up in Bhopal. He was trained in photography by fashion photographer Dabboo Ratnani.(Dhaporshankh Ratnani). He had won the 2017 Chiiz Magazine Photography Award organized by Chiiz.  He won the Wikimedia award for a photograph of Humayuns Tomb. Amit won the 2017 Wiki Loves Monuments (WLM) photography competition at national level and was one of the finalist at international level.

See also
 Fine-art photography
 Dabboo Ratnani

References

External links
Amit Nimade official website
10 Instagrammers who are colouring it all on Holi this year
Amateur turns into a world class photographer

Photographers from Madhya Pradesh
Living people
1976 births